Uzbekistan competed at the 2011 World Aquatics Championships in Shanghai, China between July 16 and 31, 2011.

Swimming

Uzbekistan qualified 4 swimmers.

Men

Women

Synchronised swimming

Uzbekistan has qualified 2 athletes in synchronised swimming.

Women

Water polo

Women

Team Roster

Elena Dukhanova
Daiana Dadabaeva
Aleksandra Sarancha
Eseniya Piftor
Evgeniya Ivanova
Liliya Umarova
Natalya Plyusova – Captain
Anna Sheglova
Ramilya Halikova
Ekaterina Morozova
Anastasiya Osipenko
Anna Plyusova
Guzelya Hamitova

Group B

Classification 13–16

Fifteenth place game

References

2011 in Uzbekistani sport
Nations at the 2011 World Aquatics Championships
Uzbekistan at the World Aquatics Championships